Ernesto Alfredo González Montoya (born September 18, 1990) is a Mexican professional footballer who currently plays for Santos de Soledad.

References

1990 births
Living people
Mexican footballers
Place of birth missing (living people)

Association footballers not categorized by position
21st-century Mexican people